Clare Michelle Calbraith (born 1 January 1974)  is an English actress, born in  Winsford, Cheshire, and raised in Liverpool and Cheshire, whose appearances include roles in the ITV period drama series Home Fires and Downton Abbey, together with the BBC2 drama The Shadow Line.

Biography
Calbraith has appeared in many other television series including DCI Banks, Silent Witness, Casualty, Holby City, The Bill, 55 Degrees North and Dr Tricia Summerbee in Heartbeat. She joined Coronation Street in 2005 for a short time to play Robyn, girlfriend of Martin Platt.  In 2007, she guest-starred in the Doctor Who audio dramas Urban Myths and Son of the Dragon. In 2008 she guest-starred in the Sapphire and Steel audio drama Second Sight and Doctors. In 2011, she played Laura Gabriel in the BBC TV series, The Shadow Line. From 2011 to 2013 she played Shep in the ITV series Vera.

Television and film work

References

External links

 

Living people
1974 births
20th-century English actresses
21st-century English actresses
Actresses from Cheshire
English film actresses
English soap opera actresses
English stage actresses
English television actresses
People from Winsford